No Fairy Tale is an album by Lisa Loeb released on December 12, 2012 in Japan and January 29, 2013 in North America. The album has received positive critical reception.

Recording and release
No Fairy Tale is Loeb's first album since 2004's The Way It Really Is marketed to adults, after she shifted to recording children's music for several years. On this album, she explores themes of her rise to fame in the music business and personal relationships. Co-producer Chad Gilbert suggested that Loeb explore her breakthrough as an alternative rock star in the 1990s and Loeb agreed, eventually touring to support this album with her former backing band 9 Stories. The album also features Loeb's first cover on an adult album, with two songs composed by Canadian indie rock duo Tegan and Sara.

Reception
Editors at AllMusic Guide gave No Fairy Tale 3.5 out of five stars, with reviewer Mark Deming praising the evolution of Loeb as a songwriting, including her decision to co-write with others and he calls this album "hands down the most fun" of her catalog. Writing for Renowned for Sound, Brandon Veveers gave this album a positive assessment, noting her strengths as a songwriter and performer on several tracks, summing up that it is "a collection containing everything needed for a comeback to be successful".

Track listing
"No Fairy Tale" (Loeb and Maia Sharp) – 2:42
"The 90's" (Chad Gilbert and Loeb) – 2:58
"Weak Day" (Loeb) – 3:27
"Walls" (Gilbert and Loeb) – 3:27
"A Hot Minute" (Sara Quin and Tegan Quin) – 2:45
"Sick, Sick, Sick" (Loeb) – 3:31
"Matches" (Loeb and Morgan Taylor) – 3:40
"Married" (Loeb and Chick Wolverton) – 3:06
"Swept Away" (Loeb) – 2:53
"He Loved You So Much" (Loeb) – 4:35
"Ami, I'm Sorry" (Marvin Etzioni and Loeb) – 3:09
"The Worst" (Sara Quin and Tegan Quin) – 2:10
Japanese CD bonus tracks
"The Holiday Song" – 3:31
"Fall Back Guy" – 3:37
iTunes bonus track
"First Day of My Life" – 3:07
Amazon bonus tracks
"Sick, Sick, Sick" (acoustic alternate) – 3:30
"Matches" (acoustic alternate) – 3:11
"Weak Day" (acoustic alternate) – 3:37

Personnel
"No Fairy Tale"
Lisa Loeb – acoustic and electric guitar, vocals
Chad Gilbert – bass guitar
Colin Strahm – drums
"The 90's"
Lisa Loeb – acoustic and electric guitar, vocals
Chad Gilbert – bass guitar, backing vocals
Colin Strahm – drums
"Weak Day"
Lisa Loeb – acoustic and electric guitar, vocals
Jarrod Alexander – drums
Paul Miner – bass guitar
Chick Wolverton – shaker
Brad Wood – piano
"Walls"
Lisa Loeb – acoustic and electric guitar, vocals
Chad Gilbert – bass guitar
Colin Strahm – drums
Chick Wolverton – shaker
"A Hot Minute"
Lisa Loeb – acoustic and electric guitar, vocals
Chad Gilbert – bass guitar
Tegan Quin – harmony vocals
Colin Strahm – drums
"Sick, Sick, Sick"
Lisa Loeb – acoustic and electric guitar, vocals
Paul Miner – bass guitar
Brad Wood – drums
"Matches"
Lisa Loeb – acoustic and electric guitar, vocals
Chad Gilbert – bass guitar
Colin Strahm – drums
Brad Wood – piano
"Married"
Lisa Loeb – acoustic and electric guitar, vocals
Paul Miner – bass guitar
Colin Strahm – drums
Brad Wood – synthesizer
"Swept Away"
Lisa Loeb – acoustic and electric guitar, vocals
Jarrod Alexander – drums
Paul Miner – bass guitar
Chick Wolverton – tambourine
Brad Wood – additional guitar, organ
"He Loved You So Much"
Lisa Loeb – acoustic and electric guitar, vocals
Paul Miner – bass guitar
Colin Strahm – drums
"Ami, I'm Sorry"
Lisa Loeb – acoustic and electric guitar, vocals
Chad Gilbert – bass guitar
Brad Wood – organ, shaker
"The Worst"
Lisa Loeb – acoustic and electric guitar, vocals
Chad Gilbert – bass guitar
Tegan Quin – harmony vocals
Colin Strahm – drums
Additional personnel
Tess Fowler – cover illustration

See also
List of 2012 albums
List of 2013 albums

References

External links

Review from Sputnik Music

2012 albums
Lisa Loeb albums
429 Records albums
Albums produced by Chad Gilbert
Pop punk albums by American artists
Tegan and Sara